Wismes (older ) is a commune in the Pas-de-Calais department, region of Hauts-de-France, northern France.

Geography
Wismes is located twelve miles (19 km) southwest of Saint-Omer, at the D132 and D205 road junction, comprising the villages and hamlets of Wismes, Cantemerle, Fourdebecques, Marival, Rietz-Mottu, Saint-Pierre-Wismes and Salvecques.

Population

Places of interest
 The church of St. André, dating from the sixteenth century.
 The church of St.Pierre, dating from the seventeenth century.
 A small château of the Louis XV style.
 The remains of a 12th-century feudal motte.

Notable people
 Baron Armel de Wismes, writer and historian
 Louis Amadeus Rappe, the Bishop of Cleveland, Ohio, United States, served as the pastor of Wismes from 1829–1834.

See also
Communes of the Pas-de-Calais department

References

Communes of Pas-de-Calais